The 2018 Monster Energy NASCAR All-Star Race (XXXIV) was a Monster Energy NASCAR Cup Series stock car exhibition race held on May 19, 2018 at Charlotte Motor Speedway in Concord, North Carolina. Contested over 93 laps -- extended from 80 laps due to an overtime finish, it was the second exhibition race of the 2018 Monster Energy NASCAR Cup Series season.

Report

Background

The All-Star Race was open to race winners from last season through the 2018 KC Masterpiece 400 at Kansas Speedway and all previous All-Star race winners and Monster Race NASCAR Cup champions who had attempted to qualify for every race in 2018 were eligible to compete in the All-Star Race.

Entry list

Monster Energy Open

Monster Energy NASCAR All-Star Race

Monster Energy Open/All-Star practice

Qualifying (Open)
Open qualifying for Friday was cancelled due to weather and Aric Almirola was awarded the pole as a result.

Starting Lineup (Open)

Qualifying (All-Star Race)

All-Star Race qualifying results

Monster Energy Open

Monster Energy Open results

All-Star Race

All-Star Race results

Media

Television
Fox Sports was the television broadcaster of the race in the United States. Lap-by-lap announcer, Mike Joy, was accompanied on the broadcast by retired NASCAR drivers, Jeff Gordon and Darrell Waltrip. Jamie Little, Vince Welch, and Matt Yocum reported from pit lane.

Radio
Motor Racing Network (MRN) continued their longstanding relationship with the track to broadcast the race on radio. The lead announcers for the race's broadcast were Mike Bagley, Jeff Striegle and Rusty Wallace. The network also implemented two announcers on each side of the track: Dave Moody in turns 1 and 2 and Kyle Rickey in turns 3 and 4. Alex Hayden, Winston Kelly, Kim Coon, and Steve Post were the network's pit lane reporters. The network's broadcast was also simulcasted on Sirius XM NASCAR Radio.

References

Monster Energy NASCAR All-Star Race
Monster Energy NASCAR All-Star Race
Monster Energy NASCAR All-Star Race
NASCAR races at Charlotte Motor Speedway
NASCAR All-Star Race